Charlie Alan Holcomb (born 4 March 1980) is a former American-born English cricketer. Holcomb was a right-handed batsman who bowled right-arm off break.

In 1999, Holcomb made a single List-A appearance for Dorset against Scotland in the 2nd round of the 1999 NatWest Trophy. Holcomb scored just 1 run, before being bowled by Gregor Maiden.

In 2003, Holcomb made his debut for Dorset in the Minor Counties Championship, playing 2 matches against Shropshire and Berkshire.

External links
Charlie Holcomb at Cricinfo
Charlie Holcomb at CricketArchive

1980 births
Living people
Sportspeople from Oklahoma
American emigrants to England
English cricketers
Dorset cricketers